Nonlabens antarcticus is a Gram-negative, strictly aerobic, psychrophilic and rod-shaped bacterium from the genus of Nonlabens which has been isolated from the core of a glacier from the King George Island.

References

Flavobacteria
Bacteria described in 2014